Nila is a 2019-2021 Indian Tamil-language television drama, which premiered on Sun TV on 18 March 2019 and ended on 24 April 2021. The show stars Bavithra and Hemanth. It is produced by Srikanth Entertainment Pvt Ltd. The series airs Monday to Saturday at 2.30 pm on sun tv. It is an official remake of Telugu serial Anandaragam which airs in Gemini TV.

Plot
Nila and Karthik love each other deeply and share an aspiration to pursue their education abroad. But Kousalya, Nila's mother plots along with her brother Narayanan and Neelambari, a vicious rich woman against Nila's dream and love. What is the mystery behind Kousalya's step-motherly behavior towards Nila? Will Nila's father Rajasekhar and Karthik survive Neelambari's treachery and help Nila realize her ambition forms the storyline.

Cast

Main
 Bavithra in dual role as Nila Karthick and Madhi  
 Rajeev Ravichandran (1-299) and Hemanth Kumar(300-489) as Karthick (Nila's husband)
 Sharmitha Gowda / Vandana Micheal as Neelambari/Bhavani Karthick's biological mother, Sanjay's adoptive mother, Ashok's sister (Episode 1-412)

Sharmitha Gowda replaced Vandana as Neelambari (Episode 413-489)

Supporting
 S.Kavitha as Revathy/Sujatha (Nila's biological mother) 
 Sridhar and Vineeth as Ashok (Neelambari and Venmathi's brother/ Anjali's husband) 
 Manju Paritala as Priya (Nila's Best Friend) 
 Dheepthi Kapil as Surya, Kathir's friend
 Vetrivelan as Kathirvelan,a Police officer
 Carolina and Srilatha as Surya's mom.
 Murali Kumar as Kulasekaran (Karthick's father)
 Sridevi Ashok as Venmathi (Neelambari's sister, Karthick's aunt)
 Sadhana and Jeevitha as Kousalya Rajashekar (Nila's aunt, Swetha's mother)
 Syamantha Kiran as Anjali Ashok (Ashok's 1st wife)
 Jeeva Ravi as Rajashekar (Nila's uncle, Sujatha's brother, Swetha's father) 
 Vasanth Gopinath as Narayanan (Kousalya's brother, Nila's adoptive uncle, Swetha's uncle)
 VJ Sam as Sanjay (Neelambari's adopted son)
 Seenu as Shridhar/Anwar, Nila's biological father
 Fouzil Hidhayah as Fatimah (Shridhar's adoptive daughter)
 Rahul as Rahim
 Reshmi and Rhema Ashok as Swetha (Nila's cousin)
 Raj Mithran
 R. Aravindraj as Guruji

Cameo appearances
Shwetha Bandekar as Chandra

Crossover episodes
 From 6 January 2020 – 10 January 2020, Tamil Selvi had a crossover with Nila
From 9 November 2020 - 13 November 2020, Pandavar Illam had a crossover with Nila.

References

External links 
 Official Website 

Sun TV original programming
Tamil-language television shows
2010s Tamil-language television series
2019 Tamil-language television series debuts
2021 Tamil-language television series endings